Argemiro Roque (30 October 1923 – 5 February 1998) was a Brazilian sprinter. He competed in the men's 400 metres at the 1952 Summer Olympics.

Decorations

References

External links
 

1923 births
1998 deaths
Athletes (track and field) at the 1952 Summer Olympics
Athletes (track and field) at the 1955 Pan American Games
Athletes (track and field) at the 1959 Pan American Games
Brazilian male sprinters
Brazilian male middle-distance runners
Olympic athletes of Brazil
Place of birth missing
Pan American Games athletes for Brazil
Recipients of the Order of Military Merit (Brazil)
20th-century Brazilian people